The Apache HTTP Server is a free and open-source cross-platform web server software, released under the terms of Apache License 2.0. Apache is developed and maintained by an open community of developers under the auspices of the Apache Software Foundation.

The vast majority of Apache HTTP Server instances run on a Linux distribution, but current versions also run on Microsoft Windows, OpenVMS, and a wide variety of Unix-like systems. Past versions also ran on NetWare, OS/2 and other operating systems, including ports to mainframes.

Originally based on the NCSA HTTPd server, development of Apache began in early 1995 after work on the NCSA code stalled. Apache played a key role in the initial growth of the World Wide Web, quickly overtaking NCSA HTTPd as the dominant HTTP server. In 2009, it became the first web server software to serve more than 100 million websites.

, Netcraft estimated that Apache served 23.04% of the million busiest websites, while Nginx served 
22.01%. Cloudflare at 19.53% and Microsoft Internet Information Services at 5.78% rounded out the top four. For some of Netcraft's other stats Nginx is ahead of Apache. According to W3Techs review of all web sites in June 2022 Apache was ranked second at 31.4% and Nginx first at 33.6%, with Cloudflare Server third at 21.6%.

Name
According to The Apache Software Foundation, its name was chosen "from respect for the various Native American nations collectively referred to as Apache, well-known for their superior skills in warfare strategy and their inexhaustible endurance". This was in a context in which it seemed that the open internet -- based on free exchange of open source code -- appeared to be soon subjected to a kind of conquer by proprietary software vendor Microsoft; Apache co-creator Brian Behlendorf -- originator of the name -- saw his effort somewhat parallel that of Geronimo, Chief of the last of the free Apache peoples. But it conceded that the name "also makes a cute pun on 'a patchy web server'—a server made from a series of patches".

There are other sources for the "patchy" software pun theory, including the project's official documentation in 1995, which stated: "Apache is a cute name which stuck. It was based on some existing code and a series of software patches, a pun on 'A PAtCHy' server."

But in an April 2000 interview, Behlendorf asserted that the origins of Apache were not a pun, stating:

In January 2023, the US-based non-profit Natives in Tech accused the Apache Software Foundation of cultural appropriation and urged them to change the foundation's name, and consequently also the names of the software projects it hosts.

Feature overview
Apache supports a variety of features, many implemented as compiled modules which extend the core functionality. These can range from authentication schemes to supporting server-side programming languages such as Perl, Python, Tcl and PHP. Popular authentication modules include mod_access, mod_auth, mod_digest, and mod_auth_digest, the successor to mod_digest. A sample of other features include Secure Sockets Layer and Transport Layer Security support (mod_ssl), a proxy module (mod_proxy), a URL rewriting module (mod_rewrite), custom log files (mod_log_config), and filtering support (mod_include and mod_ext_filter).

Popular compression methods on Apache include the external extension module, mod_gzip, implemented to help with reduction of the size (weight) of web pages served over HTTP. ModSecurity is an open source intrusion detection and prevention engine for Web applications. Apache logs can be analyzed through a Web browser using free scripts, such as AWStats/W3Perl or Visitors.

Virtual hosting allows one Apache installation to serve many different websites. For example, one computer with one Apache installation could simultaneously serve example.com, example.org, test47.test-server.example.edu, etc.

Apache features configurable error messages, DBMS-based authentication databases, content negotiation and supports several graphical user interfaces (GUIs).

It supports password authentication and digital certificate authentication. Because the source code is freely available, anyone can adapt the server for specific needs, and there is a large public library of Apache add-ons.

A more detailed list of features is provided below:
 Loadable Dynamic Modules
 Multiple Request Processing modes (MPMs) including Event-based/Async, Threaded and Prefork.
 Highly scalable (easily handles more than 10,000 simultaneous connections)
 Handling of static files, index files, auto-indexing and content negotiation
 .htaccess per-directory configuration support
 Reverse proxy with caching
 Load balancing with in-band health checks
 Multiple load balancing mechanisms
 Fault tolerance and Failover with automatic recovery
 WebSocket, FastCGI, SCGI, AJP and uWSGI support with caching
 Dynamic configuration
 TLS/SSL with SNI and OCSP stapling support, via OpenSSL or wolfSSL.
 Name- and IP address-based virtual servers
 IPv6-compatible
 HTTP/2 support
 Fine-grained authentication and authorization access control
 gzip compression and decompression
 URL rewriting
 Headers and content rewriting
 Custom logging with rotation
 Concurrent connection limiting
 Request processing rate limiting
 Bandwidth throttling
 Server Side Includes
 IP address-based geolocation
 User and Session tracking
 WebDAV
 Embedded Perl, PHP and Lua scripting
 CGI support
 public_html per-user web-pages
 Generic expression parser
 Real-time status views
 FTP support (by a separate module)

Performance
Instead of implementing a single architecture, Apache provides a variety of MultiProcessing Modules (MPMs), which allow it to run in either a process-based mode, a hybrid (process and thread) mode, or an event-hybrid mode, in order to better match the demands of each particular infrastructure. Choice of MPM and configuration is therefore important. Where compromises in performance must be made, Apache is designed to reduce latency and increase throughput relative to simply handling more requests, thus ensuring consistent and reliable processing of requests within reasonable time-frames.

For delivering static pages, Apache 2.2 series was considered significantly slower than nginx and varnish. To address this issue, the Apache developers created the Event MPM, which mixes the use of several processes and several threads per process in an asynchronous event-based loop. This architecture as implemented in the Apache 2.4 series performs at least as well as event-based web servers, according to Jim Jagielski and other independent sources. However, some independent but significantly outdated benchmarks show that it is still half as fast as nginx, e.g.

Licensing
The Apache HTTP Server codebase was relicensed to the Apache 2.0 License (from the previous 1.1 license) in January 2004, and Apache HTTP Server 1.3.31 and 2.0.49 were the first releases using the new license.

The OpenBSD project did not like the change and continued the use of pre-2.0 Apache versions, effectively forking Apache 1.3.x for its purposes. They initially replaced it with Nginx, and soon after made their own replacement, OpenBSD Httpd, based on the Relayd project.

Versions

Version 1.1:
The Apache License 1.1 was approved by the ASF in 2000: The primary change from the 1.0 license is in the 'advertising clause' (section 3 of the 1.0 license); derived products are no longer required to include attribution in their advertising materials, only in their documentation.

Version 2.0:
The ASF adopted the Apache License 2.0 in January 2004. The stated goals of the license included making the license easier for non-ASF projects to use, improving compatibility with GPL-based software, allowing the license to be included by reference instead of listed in every file, clarifying the license on contributions, and requiring a patent license on contributions that necessarily infringe a contributor's own patents.

Development

The Apache HTTP Server Project is a collaborative software development effort aimed at creating a robust, commercial-grade, feature-rich and freely available source code implementation of an HTTP (Web) server. The project is jointly managed by a group of volunteers located around the world, using the Internet and the Web to communicate, plan, and develop the server and its related documentation. This project is part of the Apache Software Foundation. In addition, hundreds of users have contributed ideas, code, and documentation to the project.

Apache 2.4 dropped support for BeOS, TPF, A/UX, NeXT, and Tandem platforms.

Security

Apache, like other server software, can be hacked and exploited. The main Apache attack tool is Slowloris, which exploits a bug in Apache software. It creates many sockets and keeps each of them alive and busy by sending several bytes (known as "keep-alive headers") to let the server know that the computer is still connected and not experiencing network problems. The Apache developers have addressed Slowloris with several modules to limit the damage caused; the Apache modules mod_limitipconn, mod_qos, mod_evasive, mod security, mod_noloris, and mod_antiloris have all been suggested as means of reducing the likelihood of a successful Slowloris attack. Since Apache 2.2.15, Apache ships the module mod_reqtimeout as the official solution supported by the developers.

See also

 .htaccess
 .htpasswd
 ApacheBench
 Comparison of web server software
 IBM HTTP Server
 LAMP (software bundle)
 XAMPP
 List of Apache modules
List of free and open-source software packages
 POSSE project
 suEXEC
 Apache Tomcat - another web server developed by the Apache Software Foundation

References

External links

 

1995 software
HTTP Server
 
Cross-platform free software
Free software programmed in C
Free web server software
Reverse proxy
Software using the Apache license
Unix network-related software
Web server software for Linux
Web server software